Freda Brierley (born 1942) is a New Zealand textile artist.

Early life
Brierley was born in Dundee, Scotland in 1942. An only child, she was taught embroidery by her mother. As a child Brierley wanted to go to art school, but instead trained as a nurse and joined the Royal Navy as a Sister in Queen Alexandra's Nursing Service.

Textile career
In 1982 Brierley moved to Devonport, Auckland, when her husband transferred from the Royal Navy to the Royal New Zealand Navy. Here she was finally able to enter art school, graduating in 1993 with a Diploma (Fine Arts) from Whitecliffe College of Arts and Design. Her work has been exhibited at the Barbican in London in 1995, and from November 2004 to March 2005 at the Auckland War Memorial Museum in the exhibition 'Freda Brierley – A Weaver's Tale and Historical Quilts.'

References

20th-century New Zealand artists
21st-century New Zealand artists
1942 births
Living people
New Zealand sculptors
New Zealand textile artists
Scottish emigrants to New Zealand
Artists from Dundee
20th-century New Zealand women artists
21st-century New Zealand women artists
Women textile artists